Kampti is a village in Burkina Faso and capital of Kampti Department.

See also 
 List of cities in Burkina Faso

References 

Populated places in the Sud-Ouest Region (Burkina Faso)
Villages in Burkina Faso